Jugend (from the German for 'youth') may refer to:

 Jugend (magazine), an influential German art magazine published 1896–1940
 Jugendstil, an artistic movement associated with the magazine
 , an 1893 play by Max Halbe
 Youth (1922 film), or Jugend, a 1922 film directed by Fred Sauer
 , or Jugend, a 1938 film directed by Veit Harlan
 Hitler Jugend, the youth organization of the Nazi Party
 Jugend haircut, a hair style